The coat of arms of Sarajevo Canton, generally known as the seal of Sarajevo Canton, is the coat of arms of the Sarajevo Canton in Bosnia and Herzegovina.

The official act of Sarajevo Canton describes the seal and flag of Sarajevo Canton, its adoption and usage. The seal is described as:

See also
Sarajevo
Bosnia and Herzegovina

References

Year of establishment missing
Sarajevo
Sarajevo Canton